The Men's EuroHockey Championship III, formerly known as the Men's EuroHockey Nations Challenge I,  is a competition for European national field hockey teams. It is the third level of European field hockey Championships for national teams.

Underneath the Championship III there exists at least one division of the EuroHockey Nations Challenge, like EuroHockey Championship IV. There is promotion and relegation. The two first ranked teams qualify for the next EuroHockey Championship II and are replaced by the two lowest-ranked teams from that tournament. The teams finishing in seventh and eighth positions are relegated to the EuroHockey Championship IV and replaced by the first or two highest-ranked from that tournament.

The tournament has been won by seven different teams: Belarus and Ukraine have the most titles with two and Azerbaijan, Croatia, Russia, Switzerland and Wales have all won the tournament once. The most recent edition was held in Lousada, Portugal and was won by Belarus.

Results

Summary

* = host nation

Team appearances

See also
Women's EuroHockey Championship III
Men's EuroHockey  Championship II
EuroHockey Championship IV

References

External links
European Hockey Federation

 
EuroHockey Championship III
EuroHockey Championship III
EuroHockey Championship III